The Federation of Free Trade Unions of Zambia (FFTUZ) is a trade union centre in Zambia.

References

Trade unions in Zambia